Ptilinus is a genus of death-watch beetles in the family Ptinidae. It is native to the Palearctic (including Europe), the Near East, the Nearctic, the Neotropical and North Africa. There are at least nine described species in Ptilinus.

Species
These species belong to the genus Ptilinus:
 Ptilinus acuminatus Casey, 1898
 Ptilinus basalis LeConte, 1858
 Ptilinus cylindripennis
 Ptilinus flavipennis Casey, 1898
 Ptilinus fuscus
 Ptilinus lepidus
 Ptilinus lobatus Casey, 1898
 Ptilinus longicornis
 Ptilinus pectinicornis (Linnaeus, 1758)
 Ptilinus pruinosus Casey, 1898
 Ptilinus ramicornis Casey, 1898
 Ptilinus ruficornis Say, 1823
 Ptilinus thoracicus (Randall, 1838)

References

Further reading

External links
Ptilinus at Fauna Europaea

Bostrichoidea
Ptinidae